Rafael Brand (born 9 September 1994) is a German professional footballer who plays as a forward or winger for 3. Liga side VfB Oldenburg.

Career
Brand was born in Bremerhaven. He joined Regionalliga Nord club VfB Oldenburg in summer 2020. In the 2021–22 season he achieved promotion to the 3. Liga with VfB Oldenburg.

Personal life
Brand has studied at the University of Oldenburg.

References

External links
 

Living people
1994 births
People from Bremerhaven
German footballers
Association football forwards
Association football wingers
3. Liga players
Regionalliga players
OSC Bremerhaven players
SV Werder Bremen players
Hamburger SV II players
Berliner FC Dynamo players
FC Viktoria 1889 Berlin players
VfB Oldenburg players